Jefferson Antonio Galves, known simply as Antonio Galves, is a Brazilian mathematician, professor of the Institute of Mathematics and Statistics of the University of São Paulo and member of the Brazilian Academy of Sciences. His field of studies is related to statistician issues models, in particular models that have stochasticity and variable range of memory. In 2007 he won the National Order of Scientific Merit. Professor Galves is also the leader of NeuroMat, a research center established in 2013 at the University of São Paulo that is dedicated to integrating mathematical modeling and theoretical neuroscience.

Galves–Löcherbach model 

The Galves–Löcherbach model is a model with intrinsic stochasticity for biological neural nets, in which the probability of a future spike depends on the evolution of the complete system since the last spike. This model of spiking neurons was developed by mathematicians Antonio Galves and Eva Löcherbach. In the first article on the model, in 2013, they called it a model of a "system with interacting stochastic chains with memory of variable length."

References

Brazilian physicists
Academic staff of the University of São Paulo
University of São Paulo alumni
1947 births
Living people
Commanders of the National Order of Scientific Merit (Brazil)
Members of the Brazilian Academy of Sciences
People from São Paulo